The graceful mountain snake (Rhadinophanes monticola) is a genus of snake in the family Colubridae.

It is endemic to Guerrero, Mexico, where it is known only from the type locality of Puerto del Gallo in the Sierra Madre del Sur, at approximately 3,000 meters elevation.

References 

Colubrids
Snakes of North America
Endemic reptiles of Mexico
Fauna of the Sierra Madre del Sur
Taxa named by Jonathan A. Campbell
Reptiles described in 1981